The Harris House is a historic house at 6507 Fourche Dam Pike in Little Rock, Arkansas.  It is a single-story stuccoed structure, designed in an ecelctic interpretation of Spanish Revival architecture.  Prominent features include a circular tower at one corner, a parapet obscuring its sloping flat roof, and a port-cochere with a segmented-arch opening supported by battered wooden columns.  It was built in 1924 for Florence and Porter Field Harris, to their design and probably the work of Porter Harris, a master plasterer known for his work on the Arkansas State Capitol.

The house was listed on the National Register of Historic Places in 1998.

See also
National Register of Historic Places listings in Little Rock, Arkansas

References

Houses on the National Register of Historic Places in Arkansas
Houses completed in 1924
Houses in Little Rock, Arkansas
National Register of Historic Places in Little Rock, Arkansas